Shannon is a small unincorporated community  located in Jefferson County, Alabama, United States, between Birmingham and northwest Hoover named after John James Shannon, a mine operator. A post office first opened under the name Shannon in 1915.

References

Unincorporated communities in Jefferson County, Alabama
Unincorporated communities in Alabama